Agitavit Solutions d.o.o. (formerly Agito d.o.o.) is a privately owned IT company, established in 2003 in Ljubljana, Slovenia. It specializes in Custom Software Development and Consulting for solutions based on Microsoft systems and platforms.

In 2010, Agito was chosen by Microsoft Corporation as a Microsoft Partner of the Year for Central and Eastern Europe and Worldwide Partner of the Year Finalist in Custom Development Solutions - Smart Client Development category. Agito is the first Slovenian company ever nominated as a finalist in a global challenge of the best Microsoft partners.

References

External links
 Microsoft Partner of the Year
 Agitavit Solutions d.o.o. Official site

Companies based in Ljubljana
Software companies established in 2003
Software companies of Slovenia
Slovenian companies established in 2003